The 1933 Illinois Fighting Illini football team was an American football team that represented the University of Illinois during the 1933 Big Ten Conference football season. In their 20th season under head coach Robert Zuppke, the Illini compiled a 5–3 record and finished in a tie for fifth place in the Big Ten Conference. Fullback Dave Cook was selected as the team's most valuable player. Fullback Herman Walser was the team captain.

Schedule

References

Illinois
Illinois Fighting Illini football seasons
Illinois Fighting Illini football